Clarence Clark may refer to:

 Clarence Clark (tennis) (1859–1937), American tennis player
 Clarence Clark (golfer) (1907–1974), American golfer
 Clarence D. Clark (1851–1930), American teacher, lawyer, and politician from Wyoming
 Clarence Howard Clark Sr. (1833–1906), banker, land owner, and developer in Philadelphia, Pennsylvania
 Clarence Howard Clark Jr. (1862–1916), financier in Philadelphia, Pennsylvania